Frederick George Sanderson (12 October 1870 – 8 December 1954) was a Liberal party member of the House of Commons of Canada. He was born in St. Marys, Ontario and became an agent, farmer and manufacturer by career.

He attended St. Marys Collegiate Institute, then studied at the Ontario College of Pharmacy. His functions with the Liberal Party included a role as Ontario Liberal Whip in 1926, and in 1929 he became chief Ontario organizer for the federal party.

Sanderson was a municipal politician in St. Marys, Ontario, as a councillor from 1908 to 1910, then mayor in 1911 and 1912, and served on the Public Utility Commission from 1914 to 1916. He served as a captain of the Canadian army in World War I.

He was first elected to Parliament at the Perth South riding in the 1925 general election then re-elected in 1925, 1926 and 1930. In 1933, his riding became known as Perth and he was re-elected in 1935 and 1940. On 13 February 1936, he was appointed Deputy Speaker of the House of Commons. Sanderson finished his term in the 19th Canadian Parliament and did not seek a further term in the 1945 election.

References

External links
 

1870 births
1954 deaths
Canadian farmers
Canadian Expeditionary Force officers
Liberal Party of Canada MPs
Mayors of places in Ontario
Members of the House of Commons of Canada from Ontario
Ontario municipal councillors